Chateauguay  may refer to:

Places

Chateauguay / Châteauguay
 Châteauguay, suburb of Montreal
 Chateauguay River, flowing in New York State and South-West of Quebec province
 Chateauguay Valley
 Chateauguay River, a tributary of the Caniapiscau River, in Nord-du-Québec, Québec, Canada

Chateaugay / Châteaugay
 Chateaugay (village), New York
 Chateaugay (town), New York
 Châteaugay, a commune of the Puy-de-Dôme Départment in France

Electoral districts in Quebec, Canada
 Châteauguay (electoral district), former federal electoral district
 Châteauguay—Huntingdon, former federal electoral district
 Châteauguay—Huntingdon—Laprairie, former federal electoral district
 Châteauguay—Saint-Constant, former federal electoral district
 Châteauguay—Lacolle, current federal electoral district
 Châteauguay (provincial electoral district)

Other uses
 Charles le Moyne de Longueuil et de Châteauguay (1626–1685), French-born soldier and Lord in New France
 Battle of the Chateauguay
 , the Joint Support Ship Project Queenston-class ship
 Chateaugay (horse) (1960–1985), American Thoroughbred racehorse
 Chateauguay River, New York

See also
Chateaugay (disambiguation)